5 Precentor's Court is an historic building in the English city of York, North Yorkshire. A Grade II* listed structure, standing on Precentor's Court, the building dates to the early 18th century.

Architect Henry Cane was living at the property in 1872, while James Boyd, a licensed preacher in the diocese of York, lived there in the early 20th century.

See also
Grade II* listed buildings in the City of York

References

Precentor's Court
Houses in North Yorkshire
18th-century establishments in England
Precentor's Court 5
Grade II* listed houses